Gondrin is a commune in the Gers department in southwestern France.

Geography
The Auzoue flows north-northwest through the western part of the commune, then forms part of its western border.

The Osse flows north through the eastern part of the commune, then forms part of its northeastern border.

Population

See also
Communes of the Gers department

References

Communes of Gers